General Cochrane may refer to:

Dave Cochrane (Canadian Forces officer) (fl. 1980s–2020s), Royal Canadian Air Force brigadier general
Henry Clay Cochrane (1842–1913), U.S. Marine Corps brigadier general
James Kilvington Cochrane (1873–1948), British Army brigadier general
John Cochrane (politician) (1813–1898), Union Army brigadier general
Douglas Cochrane, 12th Earl of Dundonald (1852–1935), British Army lieutenant general

See also
John Cochran (physician) (1730–1807), U.S. Army Surgeon General in the American Revolution
William Burr Cochran (1863–1931), U.S. Army brigadier general
Attorney General Cochrane (disambiguation)